WLGN (1510 AM) is a radio station broadcasting a classic hits format. It is licensed to Logan, Ohio, United States.  The station is owned by Wlgn, LLC and features programming from the True Oldies Channel.

The station also broadcasts at 103.3 FM from translator W277CX.

WLGN is an affiliate of the Floydian Slip syndicated Pink Floyd program.

References

External links

LGN
LGN
Radio stations established in 1967
1967 establishments in Ohio